Gilbertsville Water Works is a historic waterworks located near Gilbertsville in Otsego County, New York.  The original waterworks was constructed in 1896, and substantially enlarged and improved between 1914 and 1918.  It includes three dams, a pond, storage reservoir, gate house, control house, filter beds, distribution reservoir, water treatment building, and other associated features.

It was listed on the National Register of Historic Places in 2011.

References

Industrial buildings and structures on the National Register of Historic Places in New York (state)
1896 establishments in New York (state)
Buildings and structures in Otsego County, New York
National Register of Historic Places in Otsego County, New York